The Big Moon are an English indie rock band, formed in 2014 in London by frontwoman Juliette Jackson. Their debut album, Love in the 4th Dimension, was released on 6 April 2017, containing a number of singles previously released on their EP, The Road. The album was shortlisted for the prestigious Mercury Prize in 2017. They are signed to Fiction Records and have toured internationally. They supported the Pixies on their 2019 UK tour.

History
The Big Moon were formed in London, England in 2014 by lead singer Juliette Jackson, guitarist Soph Nathan, bassist Celia Archer, and drummer Fern Ford. The band gained exposure as they went in a co-headline tour in October 2015 with fellow London bands VANT and Inheaven. Following that tour, they supported artists The Maccabees, Ezra Furman, and The Vaccines. In 2016, the band signed to Fiction Records. In March, they released their debut EP, The Road. Later in March, 29 they released the single "Cupid". In August 2016, the group released a cover version of Madonna's "Beautiful Stranger".

On 16 December 2016, the band announced their debut album Love in the 4th Dimension, and released new lead single "Formidable". The group were play-listed by BBC Radio 1 in July 2016. The album, produced by Catherine Marks, was released on 7 April 2017 by Fiction and Columbia Records, and was shortlisted for that year's Mercury Prize. 

The Big Moon played on Marika Hackman's album I'm Not Your Man, released in June 2017. They supported the Pixies on their 2019 UK tour. The band's second album, Walking Like We Do, produced with Ben H. Allen, was released on 10 January 2020 by Fiction. On 26 February 2020, the band were announced as the Official Record Store Day Ambassadors of 2020.

The band had begun recording a third album in early 2021, but decided to delay the album in light of Juliette Jackson's pregnancy. After giving birth, Jackson began writing with singer-songwriter Jessica Winter, and the band began recording in Fern Ford's home studio and co-produced the album with Adam "Cecil" Bartlett, who had been an engineer on Love in the 4th Dimension. The album, Here Is Everything, was officially announced on 13 July 2022, alongside the release of its first single "Wide Eyes", and was given a release date of 14 October 2022. A second single, "Trouble", was released on 5 September 2022. That same month the band began a headlining tour, which kicked off with a show at Finsbury Park alongside George Ezra.

Band members 

 Juliette Jackson – lead vocals, guitar, songwriting (2014–present)
 Soph Nathan – guitar, vocals (2014–present)
 Celia Archer – bass guitar, vocals (2014–present)
 Fern Ford – drums (2014–present)

Discography

Studio albums

Extended plays

Singles

References

All-female bands
British indie rock groups
Fiction Records artists